Struppen is a municipality in the Sächsische Schweiz-Osterzgebirge district, in Saxony, Germany.

References 

Populated places in Saxon Switzerland